WGSF (1030 AM) is a Spanish language radio station licensed to Memphis, Tennessee, United States.  The station is owned by Flinn Broadcasting Corporation.

History
The station went on the air as WXSS on 1984-03-16.  On 1996-04-01, the station changed its call sign to WSFZ, on 2000-03-22 to WWGQ, on 2000-06-21 to the current WGSF.

References

External links

GSF
Radio stations established in 1984